Disharmonic Orchestra is an Austrian death metal/grindcore band.

History
The band was formed in Klagenfurt in 1987. Two demos were recorded. A gig in Germany with Pungent Stench led to a deal with Nuclear Blast in 1989. The first outcome of that deal was a split with country-mates Pungent Stench. After they released two full-length albums with Nuclear Blast they signed a new deal and released their third album on Steamhammer. The albums sound rather different from each other. The band took a break in 1994 . This timeout lasted until 2002 after their debut album Expositionsprophylaxe had been re-issued they released studio album, titled Ahead.

In October 2016 after a long break the band released their new album called Fear of Angst.

Members
 Patrick Klopf – Guitars, vocals (1987–)
 Martin Messner – Drums (1987–)
 Hoimar Wotawa – Bass (2008–)

Former members
 Herald Bezdek – Guitar (1987–1988)
 Herwig Zamernik – Bass (1988–2008)

Discography
 The Unequalled Visual Response Mechanism (Demo, 1988)
 Requiem for the Forest (Demo, 1988)
 Split with Pungent Stench (EP, 1989)
 Successive Substitution (EP, 1989)
 Disappeared with Hermaphrodite Choirs (compilation LP, 1990) on Witchhunt Records
 Disharmonisation (Compilation LP, 1990) on Witchhunt Records
 Expositionsprophylaxe (CD, 1990)
 Not to Be Undimensional Conscious (CD, 1992)
 Mind Seduction (Single, 1992)
 Pleasuredome (CD, 1993)
 Ahead (CD, 2002)
 Fear of Angst (CD, LP, 2016)

External links
 Official website
 Disharmonic Orchestra at MySpace
 Disharmonic Orchestra at Purevolume

Austrian death metal musical groups
Progressive metal musical groups
Avant-garde metal musical groups
Grindcore musical groups
Musical groups established in 1987
Nuclear Blast artists